Rodela may refer to:

Rodela, a type of round shield similar to a buckler, used by Rodeleros

People with the surname
David Rodela (born 1982), American boxer
Jose Rodela (born 1937), United States Army soldier and Medal of Honor recipient

See also

Cova Rodela, a village of Brava, Cape Verde
Rodelas, a municipality in Bahia, Brazil